James Pollock Brown (April 4, 1841 – May 30, 1913) was a Canadian politician.

Born in Beau River, Canada East, the son of David Brown and Jean Pollock both from Renfrewshire, Scotland, Brown was educated at the Elementary Schools and the Business College of New Haven, Connecticut. A miller, general store keeper and farmer, he was elected as the Liberal candidate to the House of Commons of Canada for the electoral district of Châteauguay in the general elections of 1891, 1896, 1900, 1904, 1908 and 1911. He died in office in 1913.

Electoral history

References
 
 The Canadian Parliament; biographical sketches and photo-engravures of the senators and members of the House of Commons of Canada. Being the tenth Parliament, elected November 3, 1904

1841 births
1913 deaths
Liberal Party of Canada MPs
Members of the House of Commons of Canada from Quebec